Sonchus acaulis is a plant species in the tribe Cichorieae within the family Asteraceae. It is found only on the Canary Islands of Gran Canaria and Tenerife.

Description
Perennial. Base woody. Leaves in a single large basal rosette up to 1 m across; pinnatifid, wooly, with a pointy tip. Scape up to 1.5 m, without bracts. Inflorescence an umbellate group of flower heads. Peduncles with 1 to several heads, wooly. Involucral bracts broad, very densely white-tomentose. Heads about 2.5 cm across with numerous yellow ray flowers but no disc flowers.

Distribution
Tenerife: Widespread in forest and xerophytic zones, Sierra Anaga to Teno particularly along the northern coast. Gran Canaria: Montane regions, Los Tiles de Moya, Tenteniguada, Cruz de Tejeda, Roque Nublo, etc., 500-1600 m, locally frequent.

References

External links
 Plant Lust numerous photos
 Dave's Garden plant files
 Flora de Canarias
 Calphotos photo gallery, University of California

acaulis
Endemic flora of the Canary Islands
Plants described in 1811